Charles Arthur "Bill" Roach (3 November 1925 – 3 February 2015) was an Australian rules footballer who played with Richmond in the Victorian Football League (VFL).  Less than two months after playing for Richmond, Roach requested a clearance to Melbourne Football Club, which was granted, but he never played a league game for them.

He played for the Prahran Football Club in the Victorian Football Association, where he was a life member and chairman of selectors from 1965 to 1975.

Family
Charles was married to his late wife of 64 years, Joyce and is survived by daughter Joanne, son Gary and grandchildren Jessica, Andrew, Samuel and Alice.

Notes

External links 
		

1925 births
2015 deaths
Australian rules footballers from Victoria (Australia)
Richmond Football Club players
Prahran Football Club players